Sanchai Ratiwatana and Sonchat Ratiwatana successfully defended their title by defeating Yuki Bhambri and Divij Sharan 6–4, 6–4 in the final.

Seeds

Draw

Draw

References
 Main Draw

Shanghai Challenger - Doubles
2012 Doubles